Virtuous Wives is a lost 1918 American silent drama film directed by George Loane Tucker, and stars Anita Stewart. Future gossip columnist Hedda Hopper (billed as Mrs. DeWolf Hopper) co-starred. Based on the novel of the same name by Owen Johnson, the film was produced Anita Stewart's, production company. It was also the first film produced by Louis B. Mayer.

Plot
Based upon a review in a film magazine, Amy (Stewart) and Andrew Forrester (Tearle) are happy in the first few weeks of their married life with the comforts that his $25,000 income brings. Andrew turns down a business opportunity with steel magnate Maurice Delabarre (Arden), but Delabarre decides he needs Andrew's business abilities, and invites the couple to his house. Amy finds her living standard wanting, and demands that Andrew accept the offer even though it will cause them to be separated. After he accepts, Amy throws herself into the gaieties of the social set and even challenges the position of Delabarre's wife Irma (Hopper). Irma, finding her social throne tottering, sends for Andrew. On his return, he judges Amy's new lifestyle by old standards and wonders whether she is a virtuous wife.

Cast
 Anita Stewart - Amy Forrester
 Conway Tearle - Andrew Forrester
 Mrs. DeWolf Hopper - Irma Delabarre
 Edwin Arden - Maurice Delabarre
 William "Stage" Boyd - Monte Bracken
 Virginia Norden - Mrs. Teake, Sr
 Katherine Lewis - Mrs. Teake Jr.
 Captain Mortimer - 'Jap; Laracy
 Harold Gwynn - Tubby Vandergrift
 Gwen Williams - Kitty Lightbody
 Lucille Clayton - Miss Rushin
 Thomas Carr - Bobby Delabarre
 Philip Leigh - Teddy Dawson
 George Stewart

References

External links

 
 
  At the Internet Archive.

1918 films
1918 drama films
Silent American drama films
American silent feature films
American black-and-white films
Films based on American novels
Films directed by George Loane Tucker
Films shot in Los Angeles
Films shot in New York City
First National Pictures films
Lost American films
1918 lost films
Lost drama films
1910s American films